Micropsyrassa is a genus of beetles in the family Cerambycidae, containing the following species:

 Micropsyrassa bimaculata (Bates, 1872)
 Micropsyrassa doyeni Chemsak & Giesbert, 1986
 Micropsyrassa glabrata Martins & Chemsak, 1966
 Micropsyrassa meridionalis Martins, 1974
 Micropsyrassa minima Martins & Chemsak, 1966
 Micropsyrassa nitida Martins & Chemsak, 1966
 Micropsyrassa opaca Martins & Chemsak, 1966
 Micropsyrassa pilosella (Bates, 1892)
 Micropsyrassa reticulata Martins & Chemsak, 1966
 Micropsyrassa stellata Martins & Chemsak, 1966

References

Elaphidiini